is a city in Yamaguchi Prefecture, Japan. , the city has an estimated population of 55,119, with 24,392 households and a population density of 616 persons per km2. The total area is 89.44 km2.

The city was founded on November 3, 1939, being formed by the merger of the former town of Kudamatsu, and the villages of Hanaoka, Kubo and Suetake-minami. Each of these were previously part of Tsuno District.

Geography

Climate
Kudamatsu has a humid subtropical climate (Köppen climate classification Cfa) with hot summers and cool winters. Precipitation is significant throughout the year, but is much higher in summer than in winter.

Demographics
Per Japanese census data, the population of Kudamatsu in 2020 is 55,887 people. Kudamatsu has been conducting censuses since 1920.

References

External links

 

Cities in Yamaguchi Prefecture
Populated places established in 1939
Port settlements in Japan
Populated coastal places in Japan
1939 establishments in Japan